Hector Dupuis (13 February 1896 – 12 November 1967) was a Liberal party and Reconstruction Party member of the House of Commons of Canada. He was born in Montreal, Quebec and became an agent, businessman and insurance broker by career.

Dupuis made an unsuccessful attempt to win federal office as a Reconstruction Party candidate at St. Mary riding in the 1935 federal election. His next campaign was as a Liberal candidate in a by-election at St. Mary on 16 October 1950 where he won a seat in Parliament. After his riding was renamed Sainte-Marie in 1952, he was re-elected for successive full terms in 1953 and 1957 then defeated by Georges Valade of the Progressive Conservative party in the 1958 election.

Having been awarded an MBE on Dominion Day 1946, Dupuis later returned the honour in response to the members of the The Beatles receiving the same distinction in 1965.

References

External links
 

1896 births
1967 deaths
Businesspeople from Montreal
Liberal Party of Canada MPs
Members of the House of Commons of Canada from Quebec
Politicians from Montreal
Canadian Members of the Order of the British Empire